Death row, also known as condemned row, is a place in a prison that houses inmates awaiting execution after being convicted of a capital crime and sentenced to death. The term is also used figuratively to describe the state of awaiting execution ("being on death row"), even in places where no special facility or separate unit for condemned inmates exists. In the United States, after an individual is found guilty of a capital offense in states where execution is a legal penalty, the judge will give the jury the option of imposing a death sentence or life imprisonment without the possibility of parole.  It is then up to the jury to decide whether to give the death sentence; this usually has to be a unanimous decision. If the jury agrees on death, the defendant will remain on death row during appeal and habeas corpus procedures, which may continue for several decades.

Opponents of capital punishment claim that a prisoner's isolation and uncertainty over their fate constitute a form of psychological abuse and that especially long-time death row inmates are prone to develop a mental disorder, if they do not already suffer from such a condition. This is referred to as the death row phenomenon. Estimations reveal that five to ten percent of all inmates on death row suffer from mental illness. Some inmates may attempt suicide. There have been some calls for a ban on the imposition of the death penalty for inmates with mental illness and also case law such as Atkins v. Virginia to further this. Executions still take place for those with clear intellectual disabilities due to poor legal representation and high standards of proof.

Etymology 
In 1933, Giuseppe Zangara attempted to kill President Elect Franklin D. Roosevelt but injured and killed Chicago Mayor Anton Cermak. He was convicted of Cermak's murder and sentenced to death. Due to Florida law, an inmate could not be housed in a cell with an inmate who was awaiting execution so a prisoner awaiting execution was to be held in a separate waiting cell. Raiford Prison, where Zangara was being held, already had one prisoner waiting in their "death cell" so the waiting area was expanded to a row of cells, becoming a "Death Row".

United States 

In the United States, prisoners may wait many years before execution can be carried out due to the complex and time-consuming appeals procedures mandated in the jurisdiction. The time between sentencing and execution has increased relatively steadily between 1977 and 2010, including a 21% jump between 1989 and 1990 and a similar jump between 2008 and 2009. In 2010, a death row inmate waited an average of 178 months (roughly 15 years) between sentencing and execution. Nearly a quarter of inmates on death row in the U.S. die of natural causes while awaiting execution.

There were 2,721 people on death row in the United States on October 1, 2018. Since 1977, the states of Texas (464), Virginia (108) and Oklahoma (94) have executed the most death row inmates. , California (683), Florida (390), Texas (330) and Pennsylvania (218) housed more than half of all inmates pending on death row. , the longest-serving prisoner on death row in the US who has been executed was Thomas Knight who served over 39 years. He was executed in Florida in 2014. While Knight was the longest-serving executed inmate, Gary Alvord arrived on Florida's death row in 1974 and died 39 years later on May 19, 2013, from a brain tumor, having spent more time on death row than any American. Brandon Astor Jones spent 36 years on death row (with a brief period in the general prison population during his re-sentencing trial) before being executed for felony murder by the state of Georgia in 2016, at the age of 72. The oldest prisoner on death row in the United States was Leroy Nash, age 94, in Arizona.  He died of natural causes on February 12, 2010.

Death row locations 

Notes:

European criticism of death row
Nearly all European countries have abolished capital punishment. As of 2021, Belarus remains the only European country to use the death penalty.

Around 70% of the world's countries have abolished capital punishment. These countries are frequently concerned with their citizens in the United States criminal system. There have even been instances of other countries citing human rights laws against the United States, or refusing to extradite incriminating material, in fear of their citizens being put on death row.

On November 9th, 2020, the United States received persistent criticism on its use of capital punishment during a United Nations review of its human rights record. Many allies of the United States urged that the U.S. cease executions. France urged the US halt executions, Germany suggested a federal moratorium on and eventual abolition, Austria called for immediate cessation of executions and then abolition, and Australia, the Netherlands, and Switzerland all called for abolition entirely.

Other countries 
According to Amnesty International, Saudi Arabia, Iraq, and Iran are responsible for most executions worldwide.When the United Kingdom had capital punishment, there were generally no 'death rows'. The condemned were however separated from the general prison population in one of two 'condemned cells' located adjacent to the execution chamber. Sentenced inmates were given one appeal. If that appeal was found to involve an important point of law it was taken up to the House of Lords, and if the appeal was successful, at that point the sentence was changed to life in prison. The Home Secretary had the power to exercise the Sovereign's royal prerogative of mercy to grant a reprieve on execution and change the sentence to life imprisonment. Essentially the speedy process from conviction to execution, re-sentencing or reprieve meant that there were low numbers, (if any) prisoners under sentence of death at any one time and so there was no need for a 'death row'.  Assistant executioner Syd Dernley used the term "death row" in his 1990 memoir The Hangman's Tale to refer to the situation at Wandsworth Prison in April 1951 where, as only up to two persons could be hanged at one time, the execution of murderer James Virrels  had to await the prior double execution of murderers/robbers Joseph Brown and Edward Smith a day earlier, before going ahead on 26 April.

In some Caribbean countries that still authorize execution, the Judicial Committee of the Privy Council is the ultimate court of appeals. It has upheld appeals by prisoners who have spent several years under sentence of death, stating that it does not desire to see the death row phenomenon emerge in countries under its jurisdiction.

See also
 Live from Death Row
 The Green Mile
 The Chamber
 Dead Man Walking
 Fourteen Days in May
 Somebody Has to Shoot the Picture
 List of death row inmates in the United States
 List of women on death row in the United States
 List of exonerated death row inmates
 Execution chamber
 List of wrongful convictions in the United States

References

External links
Death Row Conditions: Death Penalty Worldwide Academic research database on the laws, practice, and statistics of capital punishment for every death penalty country in the world.

Capital punishment
Penology